Baljak is a Serbian surname. Notable people with the surname include:

 Darko Baljak (born 1983), Serbian footballer
 Raine Baljak (born 1996), Filipino-Australian model
 Srđan Baljak (born 1978), Serbian footballer

Serbian surnames